The Solo free routine competition of the synchronised swimming events at the 2015 World Aquatics Championships was held on 27 and 29 July 2015.

Results
The preliminary round was held on 27 July at 09:00. The final was held on 29 July at 17:30.

Green denotes finalists

References

Solo free routine